Manchester is a borough in York County, Pennsylvania, United States. The population was 2,798 at the 2020 census.

History
Settled in 1814, the village of Liverpool (now Manchester) was incorporated in 1869 in the eastern section of Manchester Township. During the Gettysburg Campaign of the American Civil War, Liverpool's merchants were raided by the 17th Virginia Cavalry.

Geography

Demographics

As of the census of 2000, there were 2,350 people, 1,009 households, and 664 families living in the borough. The population density was 2,986.4 people per square mile (1,148.5/km2). There were 1,058 housing units at an average density of 1,344.5 per square mile (517.1/km2). The racial makeup of the borough was 97.28% White, 0.47% African American, 0.26% Native American, 0.26% Asian, 0.89% from other races, and 0.85% from two or more races. Hispanic or Latino of any race were 1.49% of the population.

There were 1,009 households, out of which 28.6% had children under the age of 18 living with them, 49.9% were married couples living together, 11.8% had a female householder with no husband present, and 34.1% were non-families. 27.0% of all households were made up of individuals, and 9.2% had someone living alone who was 65 years of age or older. The average household size was 2.33 and the average family size was 2.81.

In the borough the population was spread out, with 21.5% under the age of 18, 10.3% from 18 to 24, 34.2% from 25 to 44, 21.4% from 45 to 64, and 12.6% who were 65 years of age or older. The median age was 35 years. For every 100 females there were 95.7 males. For every 100 females age 18 and over, there were 92.7 males.

The median income for a household in the borough was $41,450, and the median income for a family was $47,845. Males had a median income of $32,219 versus $22,000 for females. The per capita income for the borough was $18,700. About 2.4% of families and 3.7% of the population were below the poverty line, including 3.0% of those under age 18 and 4.8% of those age 65 or over.

Education
Manchester is served by the Northeastern York School District.

Notable people
Wayne Schafer, business owner who moved to Manchester in 2012

References

External links
 Borough of Manchester official website
 Borough of Manchester history, North Eastern York County History in Preservation

Populated places established in 1814
Boroughs in York County, Pennsylvania
1869 establishments in Pennsylvania